Nalva (from Sanskrit  ) is a measure of distance equal to 400 Hastas (Cubits). That is equal to 9600 Aṅgula, which is believed to be equal to approximately 180 metres.

Used in Mahābhārata.

Notes

Units of length
Obsolete units of measurement
History of science and technology in India
Mahabharata